Sami Erol Gelenbe (born 22 August 1945, Istanbul), a Turkish and French computer scientist, electronic engineer and applied mathematician, pioneered the field of Computer System and Network Performance in Europe. Active in European Union research projects, he is Professor in the Institute of Theoretical and Applied Informatics of the Polish Academy of Sciences (2017-), Associate Researcher in the I3S Laboratory (CNRS, University of Côte d'Azur, Nice) and Abraham de Moivre Laboratory (CNRS, Imperial College). Previous Chaired professorships include the University of Liège (1974-1979), University Paris-Saclay (1979-1986), University Paris Descartes (1986-2005), ECE Chair at Duke University (1993-1998), University Chair Professor and Director of EECS, University of Central Florida (1998-2003), and Dennis Gabor Professor and Head of Intelligent Systems and Networks, Imperial College (2003-2019).

Biography
Erol Gelenbe is a Fellow of the IEEE, ACM, the Royal Statistical Society, IFIP and IET (London). The Mathematics Genealogy Project indicates that he graduated over 90 PhDs and is in the 25 top, all-times worldwide doctoral advisers in mathematical sciences. Awarded Honoris Causa Doctorates by the University of Rome II, Bogazici University (Istanbul), and the University of Liège, Belgium, he was elected Fellow of the French Academy of Technologies (France), the Royal Academy of Science, Letters and Fine Arts of Belgium, The Science Academy Society of Turkey, the Polish Academy of Sciences, Academia Europaea, and Honorary Fellow of the Hungarian Academy of Sciences and of the Islamic World Academy of Sciences. Son of and Maria Sacchet Gelenbe and of Yusuf Âli Gelenbe, a descendant of the 18th-century Ottoman mathematician Gelenbevi Ismail Efendi and nephew of the Ottoman Sheyhulislam Mehmet Cemaleddin Efendi, Erol graduated from Ankara Koleji and the Middle East Technical University, Ankara, where he won the K.K. Clarke Research Award for his undergraduate thesis on "partial flux switching magnetic memory systems". Awarded a Fulbright Fellowship, he completed a Master's degree and PhD thesis degree at the Polytechnic University on "Stochastic automata with structural restrictions" under Prof. Edward J. Smith.

He then joined the University of Michigan as an assistant professor, and on leave from Michigan, he founded the Modeling and Performance Evaluation of Computer Systems research group at INRIA (France), and was a visiting associate professor at the University of Paris 13 University. In 1971 he was elected to a Chair in Computer Science at the University of Liège in Belgium, but was appointed in 1974, joining Professor Danny Ribbens while remaining a research director at INRIA. He was awarded a  Doctorat d'État ès Sciences Mathématiques (1973) from Sorbonne University, with a thesis on "Modèlisation des systèmes informatiques", under Jacques-Louis Lions. He remained a close friend of Professor Ribbens and of the University of Liège, but moved to the Paris-Sud 11 University in 1979, where he co-founded the Laboratoire de Recherche en Informatique and its PhD Program, before joining Paris Descartes University in 1986 as founding director of the Ecole des Hautes Etudes en Informatique.

He was appointed New Jersey State Endowed Chair Professor at the New Jersey Institute of Technology (1991-1993), and joined Duke University as the Nello L. Teer Chair Professor and Head of the Electrical and Computer Engineering Department until 1998 when he moved to the University of Central Florida, and founded the School of Electrical Engineering and Computer Science and created the Harris Corporation Engineering Centre  He was offered the Dennis Gabor Chair at Imperial College London as Head of Intelligent Systems and Networks. After Brexit, he was appointed Professor in the Institute of Theoretical and Applied Informatics (IITIS)  of the Polish Academy of Sciences in 2017, where he was an Academy Fellow since 2013. He retired from Imperial in 2019, continuing as Professor at the Institute of Theoretical and Applied Informatics of the Polish Academy of Sciences, as Coordinator or Principal Investigator of EU H2020 Research and Innovation Project SerIoT (2017-2021)  on the security of the Internet of Things, the EU H2020 Research and Innovation Programmes SDK4ED (2018-2020) and of IoTAC (2020-2023). Active in several National Academies, he Chairs the Informatics Section of Academia Europaea since 2023, served as SAPEA Advisor on Cybersecurity for the EU High Level Group (2017), Member of the Fake-News Study Group of the All-European Academies (ALLEA, 2020-2021), leader of the Science Communication (Diffusion des Sciences) Study Group (2020–21) of the Belgian Royal Academy of Sciences, Arts and Letters, and Study Group leader on "Research to Innovation in Europe" (2022)  of the Association of European Academies of Applied Sciences and Engineering.

Notable contributions
Inventor of the Random neural network (RNN) model and its polynomial-time learning algorithm, he also invented Cognitive Packet Networks and their Reinforcement Learning algorithm based on RNNs. He invented the eponymous G-network, a mathematical model of the performance of distributed systems and networks with complex node to node interactions that analyze dynamic resource allocation in interconnected systems, and showed that they have "product form", as well as diffusion approximations for computer system performance. He pioneered research concerning the performance of multiprogramming computer systems, virtual memory management, data base reliability optimisation, distributed systems and network protocols. He formed, led, and trained the team that designed the commercial QNAP Computer and Network Performance Modeling Tool. He introduced the Flexsim Object Oriented approach for simulation in manufacturing systems leading to a widely used FLEXSIM commercial product. He published the first work on adaptive control of computer systems to optimise time-sharing systems, and published seminal papers on the performance optimisation of computer network protocols and on diffusion approximations for network performance. He introduced a new spiked stochastic neural network model known as the random neural network, developed its mathematical solution and learning algorithms, and applied it to both engineering and biological problems. His inventions include the first Voice-Packet Switch SYCOMORE for Thales, the random access fibre-optics local area network XANTHOS, a patented admission control technique for ATM networks, a neural network based anomaly detector for brain magnetic resonance scans, and the Cognitive Packet Network routing protocol to offer quality of service to users. He has also served as a consultant to Thomson-CSF, IBM, BT, France Telecom, Huawei, and General Dynamics. His awards include the Parlar Foundation Science Award (1994), the Grand Prix France Telecom (1996) of the French Academy of Sciences, the ACM SIGMETRICS Life-Time Achievement Award, the Oliver Lodge Medal (UK Institution of Engineering and Technology, 2010), the "In Memoriam Dennis Gabor Award" (Novofer Foundation, Budapest), and the Mustafa Prize (2017).

During 1984-1986 he served as Science and Technology Advisor to the French Secretary of State for Universities. He founded the ISCIS (International Symposium on Computer and Information Sciences) series of conferences held annually in Turkey, the USA and Europe.
A prolific PhD supervisor, 24 of his former PhD students are women, including Prof. Catherine Rosenberg,  Fellow of the Royal Academy of Engineering of Canada, and Prof. Brigitte Plateau, former Director General of Higher Education in France.

Latest research interests
His current research on Machine Learning and Neural Networks  and Cybersecurity He also currently  also addresses energy efficient in computer systems, self-aware networks, and networked auctions. His collaborations with biologists include Gene Regulatory Networks and Protein Sequence Alignment.

Honours
 Commander of the Order of the Crown (Belgium), by Royal Decree of 28 October 2022
 Commander of the Ordre National du Mérite (National Order of Merit), France, 2019 (awarded Knighthood in 1993) 
 Knight of the Légion d'Honneur (France), 2014 
 Knight Commander in the Order of the Star of Italy, or "Grande Ufficiale dell'Ordine della Stella d'Italia", 2007
 Commander of the Order of Merit of the Republic of Italy (Commendatore in the "Ordine al Merito della Repubblica Italiana"), 2005
 Knight of the Ordre des Palmes Académiques, France, 2003

Fellowships
 Honorary Fellow of the Islamic World Academy of Sciences, 2022
 Foreign Fellow of the Académie Royale de Belgique, 2015
 Foreign Fellow of the Polish Academy of Sciences, 2013
 Fellow of the Science Academy, Turkey, 2012
 Honorary Fellow of the Hungarian Academy of Sciences, 2010
 Fellow of the French Academy of Technologies or Académie des technologies, 2008
 IFIP Fellow, 2020 
 Member of Academia Europaea, 2005
 Fellow of the Association for Computing Machinery (ACM), New York City, 2002
 Fellow of the Institute of Electrical and Electronics Engineers (IEEE), New York City, 1986

Awards
 Mustafa Prize (2017)
 In Memoriam Dennis Gabor Award, Novofer Foundation, Budapest 2013
 Institution of Engineering and Technology Oliver Lodge Medal, 2010
 Imperial College 2008 Rector's Research Award 
 ACM SIGMETRICS Life-Time Achievement Award, 2008, describes him "as the single individual who, over a span of 30 years, has made the greatest overall contribution to the field of Computer System and Network Performance Evaluation"
 Docteur en Sciences "Honoris Causa", University of Liège, Belgium
 Honorary PhD "Honoris Causa" from Boğaziçi University, Istanbul, 2004 
 Dottore "Honoris Causa", University of Rome Tor Vergata, Italy, 1996
 France Telecom Prize, one of the Grands Prix of the French Academy of Sciences, 1996
 Parlar Foundation Science Award, Turkey, 1994
 International Federation for Information Processing (IFIP) Silver Core Award, 1980

Selected bibliography 

 E. Gelenbe "On languages defined by linear probabilistic automata", Information and Control, 16(5):487–501, July 1970.
 E. Gelenbe "A realizable model for stochastic sequential machines", IEEE Trans. Comput. 20, 199–204 (1971).
 E. Gelenbe "On approximate computer system models", Journal of the ACM 22(2):261–269 (April 1975).
 E. Gelenbe and I. Mitrani "Analysis and synthesis of computer systems", Academic Press (June 1980), 239 pp., .
 E. Gelenbe "On the optimum checkpoint interval", Journal of the ACM, 26(2):259–270, April 1979.
 E. Gelenbe "Random neural networks with negative and positive signals and product form solution", Neural Computation 1: 502-510, 1989, MIT Press.
 E. Gelenbe "Learning in the Recurrent Random Neural Network," Neural Computation, 5(1): 154-164, Jan. 1993, doi: 10.1162/neco.1993.5.1.154
 E. Gelenbe "Product-Form queueing networks with negative and positive customers", Journal of Applied Probability, Vol. 28 (3): 656–663 (Sep. 1991).
 E. Gelenbe, Mao, Z.H., Li, Y.D. "Function approximation with spiked random networks,", IEEE Trans. on Neural Networks, 10 (1): 3–9, 1999.
 E. Gelenbe and G. Pujolle "Introduction to Queueing Networks", John Wiley & Sons, Inc. New York City, 1987 and 2000.
 E. Gelenbe, R. Lent and Z. Xu "Design and performance of a cognitive packet network", Performance Evaluation, 46, (2–3): 155–176, October 2001.
 E. Gelenbe and Hussain K.F. "Learning in the multiple class random neural network, " IEEE Transactions on Neural Networks, 13(6): 1257–1267, 2002.
 E. Gelenbe, Gellman, R. M. Lent, P. Liu and Pu Su  "Autonomous smart routing for network QoS", Proc. International Conference on Autonomic Computing: 232–239, 17–18 May 2004.
 J.-M. Fourneau and E. Gelenbe "Flow equivalence and stochastic equivalence in G-networks",Computational Management Science, 1 (2): 179–192, 2004., 
 E. Gelenbe "Steady-state solution of probabilistic gene regulatory networks", Physical Review E, 76(1), 031903 (2007).
 E. Gelenbe "A Diffusion Model for Packet Travel Time in a Random Multi-Hop Medium", ACM Trans. on Sensor Networks, 3 (2), Article 10, June 2007.
 E. Gelenbe "Dealing with software viruses: a biological paradigm", Information Security Technical Reports 12: 242–250, Elsevier Science, 2007.
 E. Gelenbe, G. Sakellari and M. d'Arienzo "Admission of QoS aware users in a smart network", ACM Trans. on Autonomous and Adaptive Systems, 3(1), TAAS-07-0003, 2008.
 E. Gelenbe "Network of interacting synthetic molecules in equilibrium" Proc. Royal Society A 464:2219–2228, 2008.
 E. Gelenbe and I. Mitrani "Analysis and Synthesis of Computer Systems" World Scientific, Imperial College Press, Singapore and London, 2009.
 E. Gelenbe "Analysis of single and networked auctions", ACM Trans. on Internet Technology, 9 (2), 2009.
 E. Gelenbe "Steps toward self-aware networks", Communications ACM, 52 (7):66–75, July 2009.
 A. Berl, E. Gelenbe, M. Di Girolamo, G. Giuliani, H. De Meer, M. Quan Dang, and K. Pentikousis "Energy-efficient cloud computing", Comp. J. 53 (7): 1045–1051, 2010.
 E. Gelenbe "Search in unknown random environments", Phys. Rev. E 82: 061112, 2010.
 E. Gelenbe and C. Morfopoulou "A framework for energy aware routing in packet networks", Comp. J., 2011.
 O. H. Abdelrahman and E. Gelenbe. "Time and energy in team-based search", Phys. Rev. E, 87(3):032125, March 2013.
 Y. M. Kadioglu and E. Gelenbe. "Product-form solution for cascade networks with intermittent energy," IEEE Systems Journal 13 (1): 918–927 (2018)
 E. Gelenbe, P Campegiani, T Czachórski, SK Katsikas, I Komnios, et al. "Security in Computer and Information Sciences: First International ISCIS Security Workshop 2018, Euro-CYBERSEC 2018, London, UK, February 26–27, 2018, Revised Selected Papers", Lecture Notes, Vol. CCIS 821, Springer, Berlin (2018)
 E. Gelenbe and O. H. Abdelrahman. "An Energy Packet Network model for mobile networks with energy harvesting," Nonlinear Theory and Its Applications, IEICE (2018)  
 E. Gelenbe and Y. M. Kadioglu. "Energy life-time of wireless nodes with network attacks and mitigation," 2018 ICC: IEEE International Conf. on Comms. Workshops (ICC), IEEEXpress, (2018)
 W. Serrano and E. Gelenbe. "The Random Neural Network in a neurocomputing application for Web search," Neurocomputing 280: 123–132 (2018)
 M. G. Siavvas and E. Gelenbe. "Optimum checkpoints for programs with loops," Simul. Model. Pract. Theory 97: 101951 (2019)
 Y. M. Kadioglu and Gelenbe. "Product-Form Solution for Cascade Networks With Intermittent Energy," IEEE Systems Journal 13(1): 918-927 (2019)
 E. Gelenbe and Y. Zhang. "Performance Optimization With Energy Packets," IEEE Systems Journal 13(4): 3770-3780 (2019)
 J. Du, E. Gelenbe, C. Jiang, H. Zhang, Y. Ren and H. V. Poor. "Peer Prediction-Based Trustworthiness Evaluation and Trustworthy Service Rating in Social Networks," IEEE Trans. Information Forensics and Security 14(6): 1582-1594 (2019)
 E. Gelenbe, J. Domanska, P. Frohlich, M. Nowak and S. Nowak. "Self-Aware Networks That Optimize Security, QoS, and Energy," Proceedings of the IEEE 108 (7): 1150-1167 (2020)   
 E. Gelenbe. "Introduction to the Special Issue on the French–Polish Collaboration in Mathematical Models of Computer Systems, Networks and Bioinformatics," SN Computer Science 1 (1) (2020)  
 P. Frohlich, E. Gelenbe and M. P. Nowak. "Smart SDN Management of Fog Services," In GIOTS 2020: Global IoT Summit 2020, IEEE Communications Society, 1–5 June 2020, Dublin, Ireland, 1-6 
 W. Serrano, E. Gelenbe and Y. Yin. "The Random Neural Network with Deep Learning Clusters in Smart Search," Neurocomputing 396: 394-405 (2020)
 E. Gelenbe and M. Siavvas. "Minimizing energy and computation in long running software," Applied Science 11: 1169 (2021)  
 D. Kehagias, M. Jankovic, M. Siavvas and E. Gelenbe. "Investigating the Interaction between Energy Consumption, Quality of Service, Reliability, Security, and Maintainability of Computer Systems and Networks," SN Computer Science, 2 (1): 1-6 (2021) 
 K. Filus, P. Boryszko, J. Domańska, M. Siavvas and E. Gelenbe. "Efficient Feature Selection for Static Analysis Vulnerability Prediction." Sensors, 21 (4): 1133 (2021) 
 P. Fröhlich, E. Gelenbe, J. Fiołka, J. Chęciński, M. Nowak and Z. Filus. "Smart SDN Management of Fog Services to Optimize QoS and Energy". Sensors, 21(9): 3105 (2021) 
 E. Gelenbe and M. Nakip. "Traffic Based Sequential Learning During Botnet Attacks to Identify Compromised IoT Devices," IEEE Access (Early Access), Dec. 2022

References

External links
Erol Gelenbe's Publications as listed in the DBLP Computer Science Bibliography and his List of Collaborators (including his doctoral students).

Turkish computer scientists
Academics of Imperial College London
British computer scientists
Computer systems researchers
1945 births
Scientists from Istanbul
Middle East Technical University alumni
New Jersey Institute of Technology faculty
Fellows of the Association for Computing Machinery
Living people
Duke University faculty
Academic staff of the University of Paris
Members of Academia Europaea
Probability theorists
Chevaliers of the Ordre des Palmes Académiques
METU Mustafa Parlar Foundation Science Award winners
TED Ankara College Foundation Schools alumni
Polytechnic Institute of New York University alumni
Chevaliers of the Légion d'honneur
University of Michigan faculty
Academic staff of the University of Liège